George Stack KC*HS CStJ (born 9 May 1946) is a prelate of the Roman Catholic Church. He was installed as the seventh Archbishop of Cardiff on 20 June 2011 and retired on 20 June 2022.

Biography

George Stack was born in Cork, Ireland, on 9 May 1946. He attended school in Highgate, London, before entering seminary at St. Edmund's College, Ware, in 1966.
He was ordained deacon in 1971 and completed his seminary training in 1972, being ordained priest on 21 May 1972 by Bishop Victor Guazzelli, an Auxiliary Bishop of the Archdiocese of Westminster.

Following ordination, Father Stack was appointed curate at St Joseph's, parish, Hanwell. Between 1974 and 1977, Stack pursued a Bachelor of Education degree at St Mary's University College, Twickenham. He then became curate at St Paul's, Wood Green, and in 1983 was appointed Parish Priest of Our Lady, Help of Christians in Kentish Town.

In 1990 he was appointed Vicar General for Clergy, a post based at Archbishop's House in Victoria, London. He became Administrator of Westminster Cathedral in 1993, and was granted the title Monsignor.

In 2001, Monsignor Stack was consecrated an Auxiliary Bishop for the Archdiocese of Westminster, by Cardinal Cormac Murphy-O'Connor. In 2006, he was responsible for the pastoral care of deaneries in Hertfordshire and for Westminster's Diocesan Department for Education and Formation.

On 19 April 2011, Bishop Stack was named as the 7th Archbishop of Cardiff. He was installed as Archbishop on 20 June 2011, and received the pallium in Rome from Pope Benedict XVI on 29 June 2011. In June 2022, Stack was succeeded by Mark O'Toole as Archbishop of Cardiff.

Positions held

At some unspecified time between 1993 and 2001, while Administrator of Westminster Cathedral, he was appointed one of the first Ecumenical Canons at St Paul's Cathedral.

In 2006, Bishop Stack was identified as holding appointments as Chair of Governors at St Mary's University College, Twickenham; a Governor at Heythrop College in the University of London; and a member of the board of the Hospital of St John and St Elizabeth, London.

In 2011 Bishop Stack was listed as a member of the Department for Education and Formation of the Catholic Bishops' Conference of England and Wales, serving as the Chairman of the Committee for Ministerial Formation and Chairman of the National Office for Vocations. The 2012 Provincial Yearbook confirms the latter two roles and also identifies Archbishop Stack as a Knight Commander of the Order of the Holy Sepulchre, and an Ecclesiastical Knight Grand Cross of Grace of the Constantinian Order of St George. Archbishop Stack is the Sub-Prior of the Sacred Military Constantinian Order of St George within the Delegation of Great Britain and Ireland.

, Stack was the 'member bishop' representing England and Wales on ICEL (International Commission on English in the Liturgy).

References

External links

Archdiocese of Cardiff
Archdiocese of Westminster
Catholic-Hierarchy
Catholic Church of England and Wales

1946 births
Living people
Clergy from Cork (city)
Roman Catholic archbishops of Cardiff
Commanders of the Order of St John
21st-century Roman Catholic bishops in Wales
21st-century Roman Catholic archbishops in the United Kingdom
People educated at St Edmund's College, Ware
Knights of the Holy Sepulchre
People from Victoria, London
Irish expatriate Catholic bishops